Pavel Houška (born January 23, 1984) is a Czech basketball player for ČEZ Nymburk and the Czech national team, where he participated at the EuroBasket 2015.

References

1984 births
Living people
Basketball Nymburk players
Czech men's basketball players
Sportspeople from Ústí nad Labem
Power forwards (basketball)